Zimmi may refer to:

Dhimmi
Zimmi, Sierra Leone